Nuttapong Ketin (born 24 September 1992 in Chiang Mai, Thailand) is a Thai National swimmer. The King of Thailand swimmer. The King of breaststroke in Thailand. He competed at the 2012 Summer Olympics in the 200m breaststroke and 200m individual medley events. He competed 3 times of Asian games in the 2010 Guangzhou , China , in the 2014 Incheon , South Korea , in the 2018 Jakarta , Indonesia. He competed and got Gold-medalist in many Sea games championship.

References

External links 

1992 births
Living people
Nuttapong Ketin
Nuttapong Ketin
Swimmers at the 2010 Summer Youth Olympics
Swimmers at the 2012 Summer Olympics
Nuttapong Ketin
Swimmers at the 2010 Asian Games
Swimmers at the 2014 Asian Games
Swimmers at the 2018 Asian Games
Southeast Asian Games medalists in swimming
Nuttapong Ketin
Nuttapong Ketin
Nuttapong Ketin
Competitors at the 2009 Southeast Asian Games
Competitors at the 2011 Southeast Asian Games
Competitors at the 2013 Southeast Asian Games
Competitors at the 2017 Southeast Asian Games
Competitors at the 2019 Southeast Asian Games
Nuttapong Ketin
Nuttapong Ketin